Jean-Michel Dubernard (17 May 1941 – 10 July 2021) was a French medical doctor specializing in transplant surgery who served as a Deputy in the French National Assembly. He was born in Lyon. 

Dr. Dubernard was most famous for performing the first successful hand transplant on Clint Hallam on 23 September 1998, the first successful double hand transplant shortly thereafter (but not announced until 14 January 2004), and assisting Prof. Bernard Devauchelle in performing the first partial face transplant on Isabelle Dinoire on 27 November 2005. Dubernard was elected to the American Philosophical Society in 2010. Dubernard died at Istanbul Airport on 10 July 2021 at the age of 80.

References

Sources
 www.handtransplant.org
 
 

1941 births
2021 deaths
French transplant surgeons
Physicians from Lyon
Union for a Popular Movement politicians
The Republicans (France) politicians
Deputies of the 12th National Assembly of the French Fifth Republic
Members of the American Philosophical Society
20th-century French physicians
21st-century French physicians
20th-century surgeons
21st-century surgeons
Academic staff of the University of Lyon
Politicians from Lyon
Members of Parliament for Rhône